Lovely to Look At is a 1952 American musical romantic comedy film directed by Mervyn LeRoy, based on the 1933 Broadway musical Roberta.

Plot
Broadway producers Al Marsh, Tony Naylor, and Jerry Ralby are desperately searching for investors to back their new show. After being continuously denied for pitches, Al receives a letter from Paris, notifying him that his Aunt Roberta has died and left him half of her dress salon located in Paris. The three men and their "lady-friend" Bubbles, the person who funds their lengthy trip, then eagerly travel to Paris in hopes of profiting from the sale of Al's share in the shop. To their dismay, the men are met with a bankrupt shop that is in no shape to have shares sold. Here is when the film introduces the two other main characters in detail, the two other women who own the other half of the dress shop, Stephanie and Clarisse. From this point forward, the film develops in two main routes of plot: getting the shop into better shape to gain money, and the many confusing and slightly cheesy love story lines. Al, Tony, and Jerry make it their mission to talk to the creditors that have been harassing the shop to give them time to showcase a fashion show that will bring Roberta's more business. This ends up being successful, and Roberta's dress shop legacy lives on. As the plot progresses, Tony is torn between his growing affection for Stephanie and his desire to finance his show. Meanwhile, Jerry falls for Clarisse, and Al has a crush on Stephanie. Eventually, Al goes for Bubbles, who has followed the men from New York City.

Cast
 Kathryn Grayson as Stephanie
 Red Skelton as Al Marsh
 Howard Keel as Tony Naylor
 Marge Champion as Clarisse
 Gower Champion as Jerry Ralby
 Ann Miller as Bubbles Cassidy
 Zsa Zsa Gabor as Zsa Zsa
 Kurt Kasznar as Max Fogelsby
 Marcel Dalio as Pierre
 Diane Cassidy as Diane

Production
The film was originally announced as a vehicle for Gene Kelly and Frank Sinatra, who had teamed together several times previously. They would have co-starred with Judy Garland and Betty Garrett

Aside from keeping the musical score and retaining the idea of a dress shop being inherited by someone, it bears almost no resemblance to the show or 1935 film.

The finale, a fashion show, was directed by Vincente Minnelli, with costumes by Adrian, who designed more than 40 costumes for the film, at a cost of $100,000.

Songs
The music was written by Jerome Kern.  
 "Smoke Gets in Your Eyes", sung by Kathryn Grayson, and later danced to by Marge and Gower Champion; lyrics by Otto A. Harbach and Dorothy Fields.
 "Lovely to Look At", sung by Kathryn Grayson and Howard Keel; lyrics by Dorothy Fields.  The song was nominated for an Academy Award when it was first used in the 1935 version of Roberta.
 "The Touch of Your Hand", sung by Kathryn Grayson; lyrics by Otto A. Harbach.
 "I Won't Dance", sung and danced to by Marge and Gower Champion; lyrics by Oscar Hammerstein II and Dorothy Fields.
 "Yesterdays", sung by Kathryn Grayson; lyrics by Harbach.
 "You're Devastating", sung by Howard Keel and Kathryn Grayson; lyrics by Harbach.
 "I'll Be Hard to Handle", sung and danced to by Ann Miller and Men's Chorus; Lyrics by Bernard Dougall.
 "Lafayette", performed by Howard Keel, Red Skelton and Gower Champion.

Reception
According to MGM records the film earned $2,571,000 in the United States and Canada, and $1,203,000 elsewhere, resulting in an overall loss of $735,000.

The New York Times reviewer wrote: "The producers ... have used the full and wonderful complement of tunes from the sturdy score [of Roberta]. Thus, only the tone deaf can be apathetic to Kathryn Grayson and Howard Keel's rendition of "You're Devastating" or "The Touch of Your Hand." The bittersweet lilt of "Yesterdays", as sung by Miss Grayson, has not lost its haunting quality and the now-classic "Smoke Gets in Your Eyes" still has notes and lyrics of poetic beauty... Although all of the dance numbers choreographed by Hermes Pan are not inspired, he has inventively devised spirited turns for "I Won't Dance" and "Smoke Gets in Your Eyes" to which Marge and Gower Champion contribute professional grace, verve and charm. And Ann Miller is permitted to exhibit both her beautiful legs and her staccato tapping in a snappy run through of "I'll be Hard to Handle. Howard Keel and Kathryn Grayson, who have no need to prove their eminence as singers, again are in fine voice and make a handsome couple whose misunderstandings are inconsequential."

References

External links
 
 
 
 

1952 films
1952 musical comedy films
1952 romantic comedy films
1950s American films
1950s English-language films
1950s romantic musical films
American musical comedy films
American romantic comedy films
American romantic musical films
Films about fashion in France
Films based on musicals
Films directed by Mervyn LeRoy
Films scored by Carmen Dragon
Films set in Paris
Films with screenplays by George Wells
Metro-Goldwyn-Mayer films